The Treaty of Senock Dawkra, also known as the Treaty Friendship and Alliance, was signed on 16th March, 1740, between King Edward I of the Mosquito Nation and the British. Based on the terms of the treaty, King Edward relinquished his kingdom to King George II in return for British military protection. Moreover, the accord dictated that King Edward adopt all English laws throughout his territories.

History 
Moskito first king, Oldman, had previously traveled to England, subsequently tying Moskito and Great Britain in close relations. In 1710, a Treaty of Friendship was signed establishing a British protectorate over the Moskito Coast.

The impetus for the 1740 Treaty was to gain Moskito support in the War of Jenkins' Ear.

Moskito also fought in the American War of Independence, harassing the Spanish. In 1783, after this war, the British relinquished their control over the area, though maintained an unofficial protectorate.

Nicaragua gained sovereignty over the Moskito Kingdom in 1860 following the Treaty of Managua.

Articles 
Art 1. That he [King Edward I] resigneth all his country on each side of Cape Gratia di Dios, as far back as any Mosquito Indians or others that are dependent upon him do inhabit to the Crown of Great Britain to be settled by English men in such manner as shall be thought proper.

Art 2. That he and his people do hereby become subjects of Great Britain and desire the same protection and to be instructed in the same knowledge and to be governed by the same laws as the English who shall settle amongst them.

Art 3. That they desire the assistance of Great Britain to recover the countries of their fathers from their enemies the Spaniards, and they are now ready to undertake any expedition that may be thought good for that end themselves.

Art 4. That they receive and choose Captain Robert Hodgson their commander in chief as appointed by the Governor of Jamaica and will obey all orders and follow all instructions which he shall from time to time communicate to them from the Governor of Jamaica or the King of Great Britain.

Art 5. That they will help all Indian nations who are now in subsection of the Spaniards to throw off the Spanish yoke, and to recover their ancient liberty, and will join any force which Great Britain shall think fit to send to the West Indies for that purpose.

See also 
List of treaties
Treaty of Friendship

References 

Friendship and Alliance
1740 treaties
Treaties of indigenous peoples of North America
Miskito
18th century in Central America
Succession
British colonization of the Americas
Surrenders
Events in Central America
1740 in Central America